Holistic Image VIII, is a public artwork by American sculptor Betty Gold (b. 1935), located in front of the Danville, Indiana Town Hall which is  west of Indianapolis, United States. It weighs approximately 8,000 pounds. Completed in 1980, the sculpture was originally owned by the Indianapolis Museum of Art but was deaccessioned in 2009 and donated to the Town of Danville, Indiana.

Description
Holistic Image VIII is a geometric abstract sculpture consisting of a triangle bisected by a pentagon shape with a C-shape cutout on the proper right side, and a curvilinear C-form intersecting proper left front face. Standing sixteen feet tall and sixteen feet wide, it was crafted from a single plate of 1-inch thick raw steel. The artist's monogram, a "G" with a "b" inside, appears on the proper right, back of the sculpture.

Information
After being on display on the grounds of the Indianapolis Museum of Art for several decades, Holistic Image VIII was donated to the Town of Danville, Indiana in 2009. That same year, Danville relocated their Town Hall offices from next to the Hendricks County Courthouse at 147 W. Main Street to the former Danville Middle School at 49 N. Wayne Street. On March 24, 2010, Holistic Image VIII was placed in front of the new Town Hall building, where it is prominently visible upon entering the town of Danville on Rt. 36 / Main Street. The sculpture is known to town residents simply as "Betty."  

Holistic Image VIII was donated to Danville along with another contemporary piece called Nimrod which is located in front of the old Town Hall building on Main Street. The Town of Danville explains that both sculptures "add flavor and interest to the Main Street corridor and demonstrate that our community is interested in expanding the historical, cultural, and creative knowledge of its citizens and visitors."

References

External links
Maquette for Holistic Image VIII at the Indianapolis Museum of Art.
Holistic Image VIII on Flickr
 Save Outdoor Sculpture!

Outdoor sculptures in Indiana
Culture of Indianapolis
Sculptures of the Indianapolis Museum of Art
Buildings and structures in Hendricks County, Indiana
1980 sculptures
Steel sculptures in Indiana